There are various definitions of autonomous agent. According to Brustoloni (1991)

According tuo Maes (1995)

Franklin and Graesser (1997) review different definitions and propose their definition

They explain it

Agent appearance 
Lee et al. (2015) post safety issue from how the combination of external appearance and internal autonomous agent have impact on human reaction about autonomous vehicles. Their study explores the humanlike appearance agent and high level of autonomy are strongly correlated with social presence, intelligence, safety and trustworthiness. In specific, appearance impacts most on affective trust while autonomy impacts most on both affective and cognitive domain of trust where cognitive trust is characterized by knowledge-based factors and affective trust is largely emotion driven

See also
 Actor model
 Ambient intelligence
 Autonomous agency theory
 Embodied agent
 Intelligent agent
 Intelligent control
 Multi-agent system

References

External links

Requirements for materializing Autonomous Agents
 

Artificial intelligence
Cognition